Flipping Out is an American reality television series that debuted on Bravo on July 31, 2007, and ended on November 20, 2018. The show is centered on designer Jeff Lewis in Los Angeles, California, his executive assistant Jenni Pulos, his housekeeper Zoila Chavez, his business manager and boyfriend Gage Edward.  As well as his other assistant(s) and helper(s). In 2014, Flipping Out was nominated for an Emmy award in the Outstanding Unstructured Reality Program category.

For the first season the show revolved around Lewis' flip projects as he renovated homes and re-sold them for a profit. As the housing bubble popped in 2007, Lewis started to focus more on his home decorating consulting business and less on flipping houses, although in season 4 he considered moving back into flipping small projects on the side.

Flipping Out was renewed for a seventh season that premiered on March 5, 2014. On January 15, 2015, Bravo renewed the show for an eighth season. The show was subsequently renewed for a ninth season, which premiered on July 13, 2016. Bravo renewed the series for a tenth season which premiered on August 17, 2017. In April 2018, the show was renewed for an eleventh season.

Cast
 Jeff Lewis
 Jenni Pulos Nassos
 Gage Edward (seasons 5–11)
 Megan Weaver (seasons 7–11)
 Tyler Meyerkorth (season 11)
 Zoila Chavez (seasons 1–10)
 Stephen Bowman (season 1)
 Chris Elwood (seasons 1–2)
 Ryan Brown (seasons 1–3)
 Chris Keslar (season 2)
 Jett Pink (season 2–5)
 Sarah Berkman (seasons 3–5)
 Trace James Lehnhoff (seasons 3–5)
 Andrew Coleman (seasons 5–7)
 Katrina Stagg (seasons 5-7)
 Joe Potts (season 8)
 Matthew Ryan (seasons 8–9)
 Vanina Alfaro (seasons 5–10)

Episodes

Series overview

Season 1 (2007)

Season 2 (2008)

Season 3 (2009)

Season 4 (2010)

Season 5 (2011)

Season 6 (2012)

Season 7 (2014)

Season 8 (2015)

Season 9 (2016)

Season 10 (2017)

Season 11 (2018)

Broadcast
Internationally, the series airs in Canada on Slice, in Australia on Arena, in New Zealand on Bravo and in the Netherlands on RTL 5.

References

External links
 
 

2000s American reality television series
2007 American television series debuts
2010s American reality television series
Bravo (American TV network) original programming
English-language television shows
Television series by Authentic Entertainment
American LGBT-related reality television series
2000s LGBT-related reality television series
2018 American television series endings
Television shows set in Los Angeles